Pseudatemelia colurnella is a moth of the family Oecophoridae. It was described by Josef Johann Mann in 1867. It is found in France, Switzerland, Austria and Italy.

References

Moths described in 1870
Amphisbatinae
Moths of Europe